The Independent Democratic Serb Party (SDSS) is a social-democratic political party in Croatia representing the interests of the Croatian Serbs. It holds, progressive, pro-European stances and is generally considered a centre-left party.

History 
It was formed in 1997 and led by Vojislav Stanimirović. In the 2003 Croatian parliamentary election, it beat its main rival, the Serb People's Party (SNS), taking all three seats reserved for Serb representatives in the Croatian parliament.

After the elections, the Independent Democratic Serb Party made an agreement with the winning Croatian Democratic Union led by Ivo Sanader in which they agreed on fulfilling several Independent Democratic Serb Party demands such as refugee return, strengthening of national equality, judicial reform and cooperation with neighbouring countries. In the 2007 Croatian parliamentary election, they retained their three seats in the Parliament of Croatia.

In the Cabinet of Ivo Sanader II, their member Slobodan Uzelac received the position of vice-president of government. In the 2011 Croatian parliamentary election, they again won all three seats for Serb minority lists in the Parliament.

In the 2015 and 2016 Croatian parliamentary elections, the SDSS also held all of 3 Serb national minority seats in the Croatian Parliament, continuing to support the HDZ-led government of Croatia.

The party participated in 2019 European Parliament election in Croatia, winning 2.66% of votes. After the 2020 parliamentary election, SDSS member Boris Milošević received the position of Deputy Prime Minister of Croatia, in charge of social affairs and human and minority rights, within the Second Cabinet of Andrej Plenković, representing national minorities in Croatia.

Electoral performances

Croatian Parliament

European Parliament 

For the 2014 European Parliament election in Croatia, the Independent Democratic Serb Party joined the centre-left SDP-led Kukuriku coalition. The coalition eventually won 4 out of 11 Croatian seats in European Parliament, with SDSS received no seat.

In 2019, the Independent Democratic Serb Party ran independently for the first time in a European Parliament election. Although there were speculations that the SDSS might leave the ruling coalition with HDZ, its leader Milorad Pupovac confirmed that the SDSS would remain a part it, following a meeting with Prime Minister Andrej Plenković. Campaign was marked by SDSS jumbo posters with inscription "Do you know what it is like to be a Serb in Croatia?" in which a word Serb was written in Serbian Cyrillic. University of Zagreb professor Dejan Jović was second on the list, just behind party leader Milorad Pupovac. As it was expected by campaign leaders, the jumbo posters were target of widespread Croatian nationalism vandalism and destruction, which underlined the ethnic intolerance and discrimination issues of anti-Serb sentiment in Croatia.

Party presidents

Party platform 

The SDSS defines itself as a democratic party of liberal and social-democratic orientation but also as a Serb national party. Political goals include:
Refugee return, especially of Serbs, which its represent in parliament; finishing renewal of war damaged areas
The right to buy earlier state-owned flats, under earlier legislation (before peaceful reintegration of Croatian Podunavlje, when deadline for buying state-owned flats ended)
State protection and securing of existing rights of national minorities, especially Serbs in Croatia
Cultural and educational autonomy of Serbs in Croatia, through use of Serbian language and writings, use of Serbian national symbols, education in Serbian, foundation of Serb organizations in education and culture, foundation of Serbian information media and the maintaining of Serbian traditions and customs
Professionalization of the armed forces
Regionalism and decentralization
Croatian integration into the EU and developing relations with Serbia

See also 
 Novi Plamen, some of the party leaders are members of its Advisory Board
 Novosti, weekly magazine published by the Serb National Council (SNV)
 Serb Independent Party
 Independent Democratic Party (Yugoslavia)

References 

1997 establishments in Croatia
Political parties established in 1997
Pro-European political parties in Croatia
Serb political parties in Croatia
Social democratic parties in Croatia
Vukovar